The Egyptian Natural Gas Holding Company  (EGAS) is an Egyptian state-owned holding company, which owns and manages state stakes in different gas project. The company was established in August 2001. EGAS is also responsible for issuing of natural gas exploration licenses in Egypt.

Operations
In 2014/2015, EGAS signed six agreements, of them three offshore areas in Mediterranean Sea and three onshore areas in Nile Delta. In February 2015, a bidding for twelve offshore blocks in Mediterranean Sea was announced.

In 2012/2013, total net gas production in Egypt reached .

Corporate affairs
In March 2017 Egyptian Oil Minister Tarek al-Molla replaced the Chairman of EGAS Osama Wafik El-Bakly, by Dr Magdy Galal.

See also

 Energy in Egypt

References

External links
 

Oil and gas companies of Egypt
Energy companies established in 2001
Non-renewable resource companies established in 2001
Government-owned companies of Egypt
Egyptian companies established in 2001